Noah Worcester (November 25, 1758 – October 31, 1837) was a Unitarian clergyman and a seminal figure in the history of American pacifism.

Life

Worcester was born in Hollis, New Hampshire, to a father of the same name, who had been one of the framers of the New Hampshire constitution.  At age 16, he joined the militia as a fifer during the Revolutionary War, and was at the battle of Bunker Hill, where he narrowly escaped being taken prisoner.  He was also at Bennington as a fife major.

In September 1778, he moved to Plymouth, New Hampshire, where he taught, and in February 1782, settled at Thornton, filling several local offices, and was chosen to the legislature. Having turned his attention to theology, he published a Letter to the Rev. John Murray Concerning the Origin of Evil (Newburyport, 1786), and was licensed to preach by a Congregational association in 1786. He became pastor of Thornton in 1787. In 1802 he was employed as Thorton's first missionary in the New Hampshire society then organized, and in that capacity preached and traveled extensively through the northern part of the state. In this period he commenced a prolific writing career, contributing numerous articles to theological and popular journals.

In 1810 he became a pastor in Salisbury, New Hampshire, where his ancestor William Worcester, an emigrant from Salisbury, England, had been the first minister. Three years later, in 1813 he accepted an invitation to edit The Christian Disciple, a Boston-based periodical founded by the eminent Unitarian minister William Ellery Channing and others, and moved to Brighton, Massachusetts.

Self-educated, he accustomed himself to rigorous mental discipline. Physically, Worcester presented the remarkable contrast of robust man "of uncommon strength", combined with unusual mildness of manner.

Worcester married twice.  His first wife, Hannah Brown, died in 1797 after falling from a horse.  The following year he married Hannah Huntington, of Norwich, Connecticut. He had four sons and six daughters by his first marriage.

His brother, Thomas (1768–1831), whose pulpit Noah had filled in Salisbury, was also a clergyman.  Thomas wrote extensively on subjects related to Unitarianism and Trinitarianism. Another brother, Samuel (1770–1821), also a clergyman, was corresponding secretary of the American Board of Commissioners for Foreign Missions in 1810, and in 1815 engaged in the Unitarian controversy, his immediate opponent being William Ellery Channing.

Worcester was awarded an honorary arts degree by Dartmouth in 1791 and an honorary Doctor of Divinity by Harvard in 1818.

Peace activism

Although active in Unitarian theological controversies of the day, Worcester is best remembered as a pioneer in the American peace movement. In December 1814, he published A Solemn Review of the Custom of War (under the pen-name Philo Pacificus), still considered one of the best pieces of anti-war literature ever committed to print, and as relevant today as then.

In 1815, he founded the Massachusetts Peace Society, serving as its secretary
until 1828. From 1819 to 1828 he tirelessly edited The Friend of Peace, a quarterly periodical of the Society, as well as wrote most of its content. In 1828, the Massachusetts Peace Society merged with the newly formed American Peace Society.

William Ellery Channing's eulogy for Worcester was published in 1837. Some measure of Worcester is gained by the following tribute by his friend and co-laborer Channing:

Publications 
He wrote:
 Familiar Dialogue between Cephas and Bereas (Worcester, 1792)
 Solemn Reasons for Declining to adopt the Baptist Theory and Practice (Charlestown, 1809)
 Bible News, or Sacred Truths Relating to the Living God, his only Son, and Holy Spirit (Concord, 1810) This was censured by the Hopkinsian association, of which the author was a member, as unsound on the doctrine of the Trinity.
 Respectful Address to the Trinitarian Clergy (Boston, 1812)
 A Solemn Review of the Custom of War (1814) This was republished in Europe in several languages.
 The Atoning Sacrifice: a Display of Love, not of Wrath (Cambridge, 1829)
 The Causes and Evils of Contentions among Christians (Boston, 1831)
 Last Thoughts on Important Subjects (Cambridge, 1833)
He edited:
 The Christian Disciple (ed. 1813–1818)
 The Friend of Peace (ed. 1819–1828)
He contributed to Theological Magazine.

Further reading
 Henry Ware Jr. (ed.), Samuel Worcester (contributor: preface, notes, and a concluding chapter), Memoirs of the Rev. Noah Worcester, D.D. (1844).

Notes

Sources 
 , also published as 
 Dennis Davidson, "Noah Worcester", in the Dictionary of Unitarian and Universalist Biography.
 Samuel Atkins Eliot, Noah Worcester in Heralds of a Liberal Faith, vol. 2, 1901.
 William P. Marchione, Noah Worcester: Brighton's Apostle of Peace, on the Brighton Allston Historical Society website.
 "Worcester, Noah", in  The New American Cyclopedia, George Ripley and Charles Dana (eds.), Vol. XVI, New York: 1863. (pp. 554 – 555).

People from Hollis, New Hampshire
19th-century Unitarian clergy
American pacifists
1758 births
1837 deaths
People of colonial New Hampshire
Activists from New Hampshire
People from Thornton, New Hampshire
People from Plymouth, New Hampshire